Holanda Glacier is a glacier located in Alberto de Agostini National Park, Chile. It is located at the east end of a group of glaciers line up on the north shore of the northwest arm of the Beagle Channel. The glacier terminus ends in a small proglacial lake.

References

Glaciers of Magallanes Region